Ferrara railway station is the main station serving the city and comune of Ferrara, in the region of Emilia-Romagna, northern Italy.  Opened in 1862, it forms part of the Padua–Bologna railway, and is also a terminus of three secondary railways, linking Ferrara with Ravenna and Rimini, Suzzara, and Codigoro, respectively.

The station is currently managed by Rete Ferroviaria Italiana (RFI).  However, the commercial area of the passenger building is managed by Centostazioni.  Train services on the main line, and on the line to Ravenna and Rimini, are operated by Trenitalia. Each of these companies is a subsidiary of Ferrovie dello Stato (FS), Italy's state-owned rail company.

Train services on the other two lines, to Suzzara and Codigoro, are operated by Ferrovie Emilia Romagna (FER), which is owned by the region of Emilia-Romagna and most of its provinces.

Location
Ferrara railway station is situated at Piazzale della Stazione, at the northwestern edge of the city centre, between Via San Giacomo and Viale della Costituzione.

History
The station was opened on 26 January 1862, together with the rest of the Bologna–Ferrara section of the Padua–Bologna railway.  Three months later, on 15 April 1862, Ferrara was transformed from a terminal station into a through station, when the next section of that railway, from Ferrara to Pontelagoscuro, came into operation.

Features

Today's passenger building, renovated several times over the years, has a central hall with a ticket office and waiting room.  In its two lateral wings, there are a bar, restaurant, newsagent and tobacconist, and a bicycle storage area.

The station also has two underground pedestrian underpasses that connect the first track with the remaining 5 served by three platforms.

Outside the building, there are a taxi stand, the large parking area for bicycles (300 places), car parking (60 spaces), motorcycle parking (40 spaces), a two lane bus station for urban buses and, across the street, four bus stops for suburban buses.

Redevelopment work
Currently, the comune of Ferrara is working on the redevelopment of the station, including the insertion of a new roundabout access from Viale della Costituzione, the construction of public parking for bikes and cars and the addition of special shelters for urban buses.

The station is also affected by work on the extension of the Bologna metropolitan railway service (SFM), as it is to be a terminus of an SFM Ferrara–Bologna–Imola line.

Additionally, the station will be a terminus of a commuter service, to be introduced in the urban section (as far as Quartesana) of the FER line to Codigoro.

Passenger and train movements

The station has about 5 million passenger movements each year.

The passenger trains calling at the station include regional, express, InterCity, and Eurostar trains.

A total of about 220 passenger trains serve the station each day.

See also

Ferrara Porta Reno railway station
Ferrara Aleotti railway station
Pontelagoscuro railway station
History of rail transport in Italy
List of railway stations in Emilia-Romagna
Rail transport in Italy
Railway stations in Italy

References

External links

 
This article is based upon a translation of the Italian language version as at January 2011.

1862 establishments in Italy
Railway Station
Railway stations in Emilia-Romagna
Railway stations opened in 1862
Railway stations in Italy opened in the 19th century